Mieza, "shrine of the Nymphs", was a town in ancient Macedonia, where Aristotle taught the boy Alexander the Great between 343 and 340 BCE. Ptolemy classifies Mieza among the cities of Emathia. Stephanus of Byzantium, on the other hand, deriving his information apparently from Theagenes, alludes to it as "τόπος Στρυμόνος", and adds that it was sometimes called Strymonium. The site where Mieza once stood is the modern Lefkadia, near the modern town Náousa, Imathia, Central Macedonia, Greece, and has been the subject of archeological excavations since 1954.

Mieza was named for Mieza, in ancient Macedonian mythology, the daughter of Beres and sister of Olganos and Beroia. It was the home of Alexander's companion Peucestas. Aristotle was hired by Alexander's father, Philip II of Macedon, to teach his son, and was given the Temple of the Nymphs as a classroom. In return, Philip re-built and freed the citizens of Stagira, Aristotle's hometown, which he had razed in a previous conquest across Greece and Macedon.

Students educated at Mieza include Hephaestion, Ptolemy I Soter, Cassander, and Cleitus the Black.

Gallery

References

External links

Images of the ruins of Mieza and brief description of the site (School of Aristotle and Cultural Center, Naousa)

Bottiaea
Populated places in ancient Macedonia
Former populated places in Greece
Locations in Greek mythology
Ancient Greek archaeological sites in Greece